Gaurė is a town in Taurage County, Lithuania. According to the 2011 census, the town has a population of 418 people. Gaurė was mentioned for the first time in 1500.

References

Towns in Lithuania
Towns in Tauragė County